The Naiads are water-centered nymphs in Greek mythology.

Naiad may also refer to:

Entertainment
 Naiad (character), the water elemental of the DC Universe
 Naiad Press, a lesbian publisher operating in 1973–2003

Science
 Aquatic plant of the genus Najas
 Naiad (bivalve), a common name for freshwater mussels
 Naiad (insect), a growth stage of certain insects
 Naiad (moon), a moon of Neptune

Vessels
 A brand of rigid-hulled inflatable boat
 Naiad 18, a Canadian sailboat design
 HMS Naiad, one of several ships
 Napier Naiad, turboprop engine of the late 1940s
 USS Naiad (1863), a US Navy ship

Other uses
 "The Naiad", a nickname of American Montenegrin political activist Nicholas Petanovich

See also
 Niad (disambiguation)
 Diana Nyad, swimmer
 National Institute of Allergy and Infectious Diseases (NIAID), a member institute of the US National Institutes of Health (NIH)
 Naia (skeleton)